Televisión del Principado de Asturias 8 is a Spanish television channel, launched in 2010. It was founded and started to broadcast on 2010. TPA8 currently broadcasts in Spanish and Asturian.

Under the nickname of TPA8, it currently broadcasts the programs of TPA with a delay of 1 hour.

External links
Official Website

Asturian-language television stations
Television stations in Spain
Television channels and stations established in 2010
Radiotelevisión del Principado de Asturias